Kentucky Route 3240 (KY 3240) is a  east–west urban secondary state highway located entirely in Logan County in the south-central part of the U.S. state of Kentucky. The entire length of the highway is located within the city limits of Russellville. The highway is a former alignment of U.S. Route 79 (US 79).

Route description 

KY 3240 begins at an intersection with U.S. Route 431 (US 431) and KY 2146, the original US 431 alignment that travels into downtown Russellville. KY 3240's eastern terminus is at an intersection with US 68 Bus. on the east side of town near the Logan County Glade State Nature Preserve.

History 

Until the 2010s, this stretch of highway was originally designated as the final  of US 79. US 79's northern terminus was relocated at an intersection with the re-routed US 431 on the southwest side of Russellville. US 431 was re-routed onto the original US 79 (Clarksville Road) and the first half of the Russellville Bypass from the current US 79 intersection to the north side of the city. U.S. 79 now follows the southern section of the Russellville Bypass when it was completed.

Major intersections

See also

References

3240
3240
U.S. Route 79
U.S. Route 431